Jack Wallace (August 10, 1933 – April 16, 2020) was an American actor who is known for his roles in films including Death Wish (1974), Tune in Tomorrow (1990), Boogie Nights (1997), American Pie 2 (2001), and Love for Rent (2005).

Early life and education 

Wallace was born on August 10, 1933 in Pekin, Illinois. He attended Wells High School in Chicago and served three years in jail for armed robbery.

Career 

In 1969, Wallace began his acting career in Chicago.

Wallace was a co-recipient of the 1984 Drama Desk Award for Outstanding Ensemble, which he shared with the rest of the cast members in the Broadway production of David Mamet's Glengarry Glen Ross.  He had also appeared in such films as Death Wish (1974), House of Games (1987), Above the Law (1988) and Boogie Nights (1997) as well as television programs such as Law & Order, Six Feet Under and NYPD Blue.

Personal life 

Wallace was married at least twice.  At an early age, Wallace married and fathered two children.  He later married his wife Margot, whom he met on the set of the film Lakeboat.  They were married until his death in 2020.

Death 

Wallace died in the late night of April 16, 2020 at his home in Los Angeles, California. He long had been in declining health.

Selected filmography

Death Wish (1974) as Detective Hank
The Last Affair (1976)
Medusa Challenger (1977) as Uncle Jack
The Big Score (1983) as Policeman #1
House of Games (1987) as Bartender / House of Games
Above the Law (1988) as Uncle Branca
Things Change (1988) as Repair Shop Owner
The Bear (1988) as Bill
State of Grace (1990) as Matty's Bartender
Tune in Tomorrow (1990) as Policeman
Fatal Encounter (1990)
Homicide (1991) as Frank
Liebestraum (1991) as Mike
Mad Dog and Glory (1993) as Tommy the Bartender
Minotaur (1994) as Father
Frasier (1994, TV Series) as Joe
Steal Big Steal Little (1995) as Nick's Boy
Nixon (1995) as Football Coach
The Killing Jar (1997) as Dick Resigy
Levitation (1997) as The Bartender
Amnesia (1997) as Sheriff
Cold Around the Heart (1997) as Police Captain Man
The Spanish Prisoner (1997) as Sanitation Man
Boogie Nights (1997) as Rocky
Sparkler (1997) as Jesse
Anarchy TV (1998) as Mr. Harris
Twilight (1998) as Interrogation Officer
Brown's Requiem (1998) as Bud Myers
Stranger in My House (1999) as Chief Lewis
Lakeboat (2000) as Fred
Jacks or Better (2000) as Jack
State and Main (2000) as Bellhop
American Pie 2 (2001) as Enthusiastic Guy
According to Spencer (2001) as Waiter
Beyond the City Limits (2001) as Detective McMahon
Duty Dating (2002) as Mr. Penn
Fairie (2002) as Finvara
The Employee of the Month (2002) as Harry
Love for Rent (2005) as Uncle Todd
Edmond (2005) as Chaplain
Journeyman (2005) as Dreamer
Redbelt (2008) as Bar Patron
Faster (2010) as Joe, Bathroom Attendant
An Old Man's Gold (2012) as Charlie Dawson
Coffee, Kill Boss (2013) as Jim T. Pruit
Welcome to Me (2014) as Bud Klieg
The Boy Next Door (2015) as Mr. Sandborn
Band of Robbers (2015) as 'Doc' Robinson
Nocturnal Animals (2016) as Old Man (uncredited)
Extortion (2017) as Lucas
Spivak (2018) as Bartender
Senior Moment (2021) as Ted Garvin

References

External links
 
 
 

1933 births
2020 deaths
American male stage actors
American male television actors
American male film actors
20th-century American male actors
21st-century American male actors
Drama Desk Award winners
People from Pekin, Illinois
Male actors from Illinois